Tin Sam Tsuen aka. Tin Sam Wai is a walled village in Hung Shui Kiu, Ha Tsuen, Yuen Long District, Hong Kong.

Administration
Tin Sum Tsuen is a recognized village under the New Territories Small House Policy. Tin Sam Tsuen is one of the villages represented within the Ha Tsuen Rural Committee. For electoral purposes, Tin Sam Tsuen is part of the Ha Tsuen constituency, which is currently represented by Tang Ka-leung.

See also
 Walled villages of Hong Kong

References

External links

 Delineation of area of existing village Tin Sum Tsuen (Ha Tsuen) for election of resident representative (2019 to 2022)
 Antiquities Advisory Board. Historic Building Appraisal. Shrine, Tin Sam Tsuen, Hung Shui Kiu Pictures

Walled villages of Hong Kong
Ha Tsuen
Villages in Yuen Long District, Hong Kong